Galesburg City can refer to:
Galesburg, Illinois
Galesburg, Kansas
Galesburg, Michigan
Galesburg, North Dakota